Mee-Len Chye is a Chinese biologist, currently the Wilson and Amelia Wong Professor in Plant Biotechnology at University of Hong Kong.

References

Year of birth missing (living people)
Living people
Academic staff of the Hong Kong University of Science and Technology
Chinese biologists